Pakenham Street is a street in Fremantle, Western Australia, in the Fremantle West End Heritage area. It runs between Phillimore Street and Collie Street, the main cross intersection being with High Street.

The street is named after the third lieutenant aboard , H. Pakenham.

Significant heritage buildings have been located on the corner of Pakenham and High Streets.

In the 1920s Pakenham Street was widened following railway land being released.

Places of interest along the street include:
 Pioneer Park, Fremantle
 Fremantle Trades Hall, corner of Collie Street
 Fowler's Warehouse
 Oceanic Hotel, corner of Collie Street
 Central Chambers, corner of High Street
 Tolley & Company Warehouse
 Robert Harper Building, corner of Phillimore Street.

References

Streets in Fremantle
Fremantle West End Heritage area